AUAA refers to

 Artists United Against Apartheid
 The Atlantic Universities Athletics Association, which became Atlantic University Sport in 1999